GodWeenSatan Live is Ween's seventh live album. It was released on November 18, 2016 on Chocodog Records.

This album is a 2-disc chronicling of a performance from September 14, 2001 in which Ween played their first album, "GodWeenSatan: The Oneness", in its entirety, for its 11th (advertised as 25th) anniversary re-release. The show almost did not happen due to the 9/11 terrorist attacks that had taken place three days prior. It was performed at John & Peters, in New Hope, Pennsylvania, where founding members Gene and Dean Ween are from.

Track listing
All tracks written by Ween, except "L.M.L.Y.P.", which contains elements of "Shockadelica" and "Alphabet St." by Prince.

Disc one

Disc two

Personnel
Ween
 Claude Coleman Jr. – drums
 Dave Dreiwitz – bass
 Gene Ween – vocals, guitar
 Dean Ween – guitar, vocals
 Andrew Weiss – bass, keyboards, sound effects
Production
 Kirk Miller – live sound engineer
 Tom Ruff – recording, mixing, mastering
 Lindsay Brown – management
 Patrick Jordan – management
 Brad Sands – management
 Aaron Tanner – art direction, design
 Jeff Rusnak – photography

References

2016 live albums
Ween live albums